Rancho San Francisco was a land grant in present-day northwestern Los Angeles County and eastern Ventura County, California. It is not related to the city of San Francisco.

The rancho is the location of the first popularly known finding of gold in the Southern California area in 1842, in Placerita Canyon. Much of the present day city of Santa Clarita lies within the boundary of what was Rancho San Francisco. The adobe headquarters of the rancho, and the site of the gold find (known today as the "Oak of the Golden Dream"), are designated California Historical Landmarks. The rancho included portions of the San Gabriel, Santa Susana, Topatopa, and Sierra Pelona Mountain ranges.

Early history
After Mission San Fernando Rey de España was established in 1797, the administrators there realized they would need more land for agriculture and livestock, and they looked north to the Santa Clarita Valley to establish their estancia, or mission rancho. Subsequently, the Tataviam who had been living there were relocated to the Mission, where they were baptized and conscripted for work. The Estancia de San Francisco Xavier was built in 1804 at the confluence of Castaic Creek and the Santa Clara River in what is now the unincorporated community of Castaic Junction.

Following the Mexican War of Independence, the missions were secularized and the land taken by the Mexican government. In 1834, Lieutenant Antonio del Valle was assigned to inventory the property of Mission San Fernando. The rancho was supposed to be returned to the Tataviam, but Governor Alvarado deeded it to his friend Del Valle instead on January 22, 1839. The Del Valle family moved into the former estancia buildings (near what is now Castaic).

Del Valle died in 1841. On his deathbed, he attempted to reconcile with his estranged son Ygnacio by writing him a letter and offering the entire rancho to him as his inheritance. Del Valle died before his son received the letter. Ygnacio did return and took possession of the land, but after a lawsuit the property was split with his stepmother.

Discovery of gold

According to a local legend, Francisco López, the uncle of Antonio's second wife, Jacoba Feliz, took a rest under an oak tree in Placerita Canyon on March 9, 1842, and had a dream that he was floating on a pool of gold. When he awoke, he pulled a few wild onions from the ground finding flakes of gold in the roots. Contrary to this portrait of him as a farmer who stumbled upon his discovery, López had studied mineralogy at the University of Mexico and had been actively searching for gold. Evidence suggests that gold had previously been found in the area about thirty years prior, but the López gold find was the first popularly documented incident in the area. This sparked a gold rush on a much smaller scale than the 1849 California Gold Rush. About 2,000 people, mostly from the Mexican state of Sonora, came to Rancho San Francisco to mine the gold.

Knowledge of the gold find seems to have remained largely within Mexican territory. John Sutter and his "right-hand man" John Bidwell, both of whom sided with Governor Manuel Micheltorena during his power struggle with former governor Juan Bautista Alvarado, were imprisoned after the latter's side won the bloodless Battle of Providencia in 1845. After their release, Bidwell headed north through Placerita Canyon, saw the mining operations, and was determined to search for gold on his way to Sutter's Fort.

During the Mexican–American War, Del Valle destroyed the mine to prevent the United States from gaining its control. The tree where López took his nap is now known as the "Oak of the Golden Dream" and is registered as California Historic Landmark #168.

Later history
The Treaty of Guadalupe Hidalgo endorsed legitimate land titles held by the ceded land's owners. Jacoba Feliz sued for control of Rancho San Francisco. She prevailed and a judgment was issued in her favor in 1857.

Unfortunately, at this time Southern California experienced a great deal of flooding, and ranchers were forced to mortgage their properties in order to sustain their needs during the interruption in producing their food and needs and other damages to the land and buildings. Feliz mortgaged her portion of the land to William Wolfskill, who returned a portion of it back to Del Valle in exchange for him settling her debts. Floods were followed by droughts, which again exacerbated the ranchers' problems. Finally, in 1862 Del Valle was forced to sell off most of his land to oil speculators (the Philadelphia and California Petroleum Company headed by  Thomas A. Scott), keeping only his Rancho Camulos. The oilmen were unable to find any oil, and Rancho San Francisco eventually landed in the hands of Henry Newhall, whose name is now closely associated with the Santa Clarita Valley area.

Newhall granted right-of-way to Southern Pacific Railroad to build a rail line to Los Angeles and sold them a portion of the land, upon which sprang a new town that the company named after him, Newhall. Another town grew around the train station and Newhall named it after his hometown, Saugus.

After Newhall's death in 1882, his heirs formed the Newhall Land and Farming Company, which managed the lands. In 1936, Atholl McBean, Newhall's grandson-in-law, found oil on the property and changed the name to Newhall Ranch.

Historic designations

California Historical Landmark No. 556 Rancho San Francisco Adobe
marker reads:

Placerita Canyon State Park – California Historical Landmark No. 168 Oak of the Golden Dream: where Francisco López found gold. The marker reads:

See also
Ranchos of California
List of Ranchos of California

Notes

References

External links
Map of old Spanish and Mexican ranchos in Los Angeles County

San Francisco, Rancho
San Francisco
San Francisco
San Gabriel Mountains
Santa Clara River (California)
Santa Clarita, California
Santa Susana Mountains
Sierra Pelona Ridge
Topatopa Mountains
California Historical Landmarks
Oak of the Golden Dream